Drainage law is a specific area of water law related to drainage of surface water on real property. It is particularly important in areas where freshwater is scarce, flooding is common, or water is in high demand for agricultural or commercial purposes.

In the United States

In the United States, regulation of drainage is typically done on the state and local level. In addition to whatever statutes or local ordinances may be in effect in a given locality, there are three basic legal doctrines which the various state courts recognize.

In the state of Michigan, drainage law is so important that counties elect a drain commissioner to oversee water resources.

Common enemy doctrine
The common enemy doctrine is a rule derived from English common law.  It holds that since surface water is a "common enemy" to landowners, each landowner has the right to alter the drainage pattern of his land (for example by building dikes or drainage channels) without regard for the effects on neighboring parcels, as long as that water flows to where it otherwise would have naturally flowed.  Typically, a landowner can capture surface water (e.g. by rain barrels or dams) as well, and lower landowners will not have a cause of action unless the diversion is malicious.  This rule is followed by approximately half the U.S. states, although some states have modified the doctrine to hold landowners liable for negligent damage to the parcels belonging to neighboring landowners.

Civil law rule
The civil law rule (so named because it is derived from the civil law systems of France and Spain) is effectively the opposite of the common enemy doctrine. It holds that the owner of a lower parcel of land must accept the natural drainage from those parcels above his, and cannot alter the drainage pattern of his own land to increase the drainage flow onto parcels lower than his own.  For this reason, this rule is sometimes referred to as the "natural flow rule".

Application of the civil law rule in its purest form would inhibit the development of land, since virtually every improvement on a parcel would alter the natural drainage.  For this reason, this rule has been modified in those jurisdictions that use it, to permit reasonable changes in natural flow, often weighing the competing interests of neighboring landholders with the benefit of the development of the parcel.

Reasonable use rule
The reasonable use rule presents an alternative to both the common enemy doctrine and the civil law rule. It allows a landowner to make "reasonable" alteration to the drainage pattern of his parcel, with liability only occurring when the alteration causes "unreasonable" harm toward neighboring parcels. Judicial mitigation of the common enemy doctrine and civil law rule often results in an approximation of the reasonable use rule.

Because the reasonable use rule presents a subjective standard, courts will often employ a balancing test to determine whether a landowner is liable to neighbors for alteration of drainage. For example, under the Restatement of Torts, the test was:

 Was there reasonable necessity for the property owner to alter the drainage to make use of their land?
 Was the alteration done in a reasonable manner?
 Does the utility of the actor’s conduct reasonably outweigh the gravity of harm to others?

In the United Kingdom

In the United Kingdom the Land Drainage Act 1991 decrees drainage of land in England and Wales, but does not cover sewerage and water supplies but the actual process of draining land itself. The act defines who is responsible for various aspects of land drainage and the different areas in which the law applies.

See also
 Land Drainage Act 
 Best management practice for water pollution
 New Jersey stormwater management rules
 United States groundwater law
 Water politics

Further reading
"Sewers and drains". Halsbury's Laws of England. First Edition. Volume 25.
G G Kennedy and J S Sandars. The Law of Land Drainage & Sewers. Waterlow Bros & Layton. London. 1884. HathiTrust
The Drainage Acts, Ontario. A Poole. Toronto. 1908. HathiTrust
Garner's Law of Sewers and Drains. Ninth Edition. Shaw & Sons. 2004. Google Books
John Francis Garner. The Law of Sewers and Drains: Under the Public Health Acts. Shaw. 1950. Google Books
Humphry William Woolrych. A Treatise on the Law of Waters, and of Sewers. Sauders and Benning. Fleet Street, London. 1830. Google Books.
Humphry William Woolrych. A Treatise of the Law of Sewers, including the Drainage Acts. Second Edition. 1849. Third Edition. 1864. HathiTrust
The Laws of Sewers. Printed by E and R Nutt and R Gosling at the Lamb without Temple Bar. 1726. Google Books
William John Broderip. The Reading of the Famous and Learned Robert Callis Esq Upon the Statute of Sewers. Fourth Edition. Joseph Butterworth and Son. 1824. Google Books
Clarke's Bibliotheca Legum. Chapter 19 (Law of Sewers). Page 323.

References

External links
 Discussion of Connecticut surface water law from the Connecticut State Law Library
 Section 400 of the Hydrologic Criteria and Drainage Design Manual from the Clark County Regional Flood Control District, which provides an extensive discussion of drainage law in Nevada.
 The Iowa Drainage Law Manual, from the Center for Transportation Research and Education at Iowa State University
Articles on flood damage litigation and "reasonable care" in surface water law from University of Missouri at Rolla
Bibliography on Water Resources and International Law, from the Peace Palace Library

Water law
Drainage
Land management
Land law